The Mongolian Gender Equality Center (MGEC) is a non-governmental organization based in Ulaanbaatar, Mongolia, established in 2002 to fight the growing crime of human trafficking in Mongolia, focusing on protecting young women and girls, the primary group affected.

The MGEC has lobbied to improve legislation against human trafficking, runs prevention, awareness and advocacy programs and provides legal advocacy, shelter, counseling services and vocational training for repatriated victims of trafficking. The organization has developed a range of educational materials and publications for social workers, teachers, students, police and other officials. Recently, the MGEC has been developing educational tools for parents and teachers on child safety to help prevent sexual abuse of children.

Notable areas of work

Gender Equality 

MGEC has developed and published a handbook on gender equality (in partnership with the National Pedagogical University and the Science and Technology University of Mongolia). In addition, the organization runs educational programs from primary school to university, and is also currently a member of a lobby group that drafts laws on gender equality.

Victim protection 
In 2007 MGEC initiated the "Direct Assistance to Victims of Human Trafficking Program" with assistance from the International Organization for Migration. Since then the program has provided 679 VOTs with assistance from the MGEC including repatriation, rehabilitation and reintegration into the Mongolian community.[5] Between 2016 and 2017, 63 victims of trafficking were identified and provided with complete reintegration assistance.

Foreign marriage 

Between 2000 and 2008 the number of marriages of Mongolian women to foreign nationals increased from 79 to 3,485, and 67.8% of these were to Korean nationals. In July 2008, MGEC, together with the Government of the Republic of Korea and the Mongolian Ministry of Social Welfare & Labour, provided a one-day training program for Mongolian brides. The program focused on Korean culture, language and society, the legal regulations regarding marriage and divorce in Korea, and gave extensive advice on trafficking, domestic violence and abuse.

Partner organizations 
MGEC is a member of Global Alliance Against Traffic in Women (GAATW).

See also 

 Human Trafficking in Mongolia
 United Nations Global Initiative to Fight Human Trafficking

References

External links 
MGEC Facebook page
 US Department of State Trafficking Report_2017
 US Department of State Trafficking Report_Mongolia

Organizations that combat human trafficking
Slavery in Asia
Gender equality
Human trafficking in Mongolia